Joseph Dwyer may refer to:
Joseph Dwyer (physicist) (born 1963), American physicist
Joseph Dwyer (engineer) (1939–2021), British civil engineer and businessman
Joseph Wilfrid Dwyer (1869–1939), Australian bishop
Joe Dwyer (1903–1992), baseball player
Joseph Patrick Dwyer (1976–2008), American soldier
Joseph Dwyer (American football) (died 1968), American football coach
Joseph Dwyer, a character in the 1988 film 555